Saint-Léonard Aerodrome  is located  southeast of Saint-Léonard, New Brunswick, Canada.

Recent history
The city of Edmundston purchased the airport for $1 and subsequently transferred the ownership to Madawaska Airport Authority. In July 2015, Madawaska Airport Authority announced it would shut down some of the airport operations. J.D. Irving and local community groups intervened to halted the closure of the airport. In October 2017, J.D. Irving purchased the airport for $100,000.

Service
The airport had regularly scheduled flights to Montreal (Dorval) on Air Nova for part of the 1980s and 1990s.

References

External links

Registered aerodromes in New Brunswick
Transport in Madawaska County, New Brunswick
Buildings and structures in Madawaska County, New Brunswick